The following list shows NCAA Division I football programs by winning percentage during the 1910–1919 football seasons. During this time the NCAA did not have any formal divisions. The following list reflects the records according to the NCAA. Due to the Spanish flu pandemic of 1918, many teams did not field a team during the 1918 season. This list takes into account results modified later due to NCAA action, such as vacated victories and forfeits.

 Chart notes

 Did not field a team during the 1918 season due to the Spanish flu pandemic.
 Centre joined Division I in 1919.
 Mare Island Marines was a military team that competed in 1917 & 1918 during World War I.
 Great Lakes Navy was a military team that competed in 1918 during World War I.
 Swarthmore joined Division I for the 1912 season.
 Tulsa joined Division I in 1914.
 Princeton did not field a team during the 1917 & 1918 seasons.
 Rice's first season was in 1912.
 Chattanooga left Division I after the 1910 season.
 Georgia did not field a team in 1917 & 1918.
 Rutgers rejoined Division I in 1914, but did not play Division I during the 1915 season.
 Presbyterian joined Division I in 1915.
 USC did not field a team during the 1911-1913 seasons.
 California resumed football play in 1915.
 Carlisle dropped football after the 1917 season.
 North Carolina did not field a team during the 1917 & 1918 seasons.
 Stanford restarted their football team in 1919.
 Temple did not field a team from 1918-1921.
 Columbia resumed football play in 1915.
 Furman joined Division I in 1915.
 Spring Hill played Division I during the 1919 season.
 West Virginia Wesleyan joined Division I for the 1913-1916 seasons.
 UTEP's first season was in 1914.
 SMU's first season was in 1916.
 Mississippi College joined Division I for the 1911, 1912, 1915, 1916 & 1919 seasons.
 Arizona State only fielded a team for the 1914-1916 and 1919 seasons.
 Haskell joined Division I for the 1910 & 1914-1916 seasons.
 Newberry joined Division I in 1914 and also did not field a team in 1918.
 Idaho joined Division I for the 1917 season.
 Wofford joined Division I in 1914.
 Dickinson left Division I after the 1910 season.
 Erskine joined Division I for the 1919 season.
 Oglethorpe joined Division I in 1919.
 UCLA's first season was in 1919.
 Grinnell joined Division I in 1919.
 Samford did not play Division I during the 1913-1918 seasons.
 Montana joined Division I for the 1917 season.
 Carnegie Mellon joined Division I for the 1910 season.

See also
 NCAA Division I FBS football win–loss records
 NCAA Division I football win–loss records in the 1920s

References

Lists of college football team records